The 2006 FIM Superstock 1000 Cup was the eighth edition of the FIM Superstock 1000 Cup, the second held under this name. It was run over ten rounds, starting on 23 April in Valencia, Spain, and ending on 8 October in Magny-Cours, France.

The riders' championship was won by Alessandro Polita on a Suzuki GSX-R1000 K6 entered by Celani Suzuki Italia. His main rivals throughout the season were Claudio Corti aboard a Yamaha Team Italia's R1 and two MV Agusta riders, Luca Scassa and Ayrton Badovini. These four Italian riders scored all the pole positions except for the Valencia round and all the race victories.

The manufacturers' championship was won by Suzuki, while the season also saw the first victory for MV Agusta at world level since the 1976 German motorcycle Grand Prix.

Championship standings

Riders' championship

Manufacturers' championship

References

External links

Superstock 1000
FIM Superstock 1000 Cup seasons
FIM Superstock 1000 Cup